Udelny (masculine), Udelnaya (feminine), or Udelnoye (neuter) may refer to:
Udelny (inhabited locality) (Udelnaya, Udelnoye), name of several inhabited localities in Russia
Udelnaya (Saint Petersburg Metro), a station of the Saint Petersburg Metro, Saint Petersburg, Russia